Clypeostoma is a genus of mostly small deep water sea snails, marine gastropod mollusks in the family Chilodontaidae.

Species in this genus were previously categorized under the genus Agathodonta Cossmann, 1918

Species
Species within the genus Clypeostoma include:
 Clypeostoma adelon Vilvens, 2017
 Clypeostoma cancellatum (Schepman, 1908)
 Clypeostoma cecileae (Poppe, Tagaro & Dekker, 2006)
 Clypeostoma chranos Vilvens, 2017
 Clypeostoma elongatum (Vilvens, 2001)
 Clypeostoma meteorae (Neubert, 1998)
 Clypeostoma nortoni (McLean, 1984)
 Clypeostoma reticulatum Herbert, 2012
 Clypeostoma salpinx (Barnard, 1964)
 Clypeostoma townsendianum (Melvill & Standen, 1903)

References

 Poppe, G., Tagaro, S. & Dekker, H., 2006. The Seguenziidae, Chilodontidae, Trochidae, Calliostomatidae and Solariellidae of the Philippines Islands. Visaya: 1-128, sér. Supplément 2
New species and new records of Chilodontidae (Gastropoda: Vetigastropoda: Seguenzioidea) from the Pacific Ocean. Novapex 18: 1-67, sér. HS 11

External links
 To World Register of Marine Species
 Herbert, D. G. (2012). A Revision of the Chilodontidae (Gastropoda: Vetigastropoda: Seguenzioidea) of Southern Africa and the South-Western Indian Ocean. African Invertebrates. 53(2): 381-502.

 
Chilodontaidae
Gastropod genera